Coffman is a surname. Notable people with the surname include:

Amber Coffman (born 1984), singer and musician
Carson Coffman (born 1988), quarterback for the Utah Blaze
Chase Coffman (born 1986), American footballer for the Tampa Bay Buccaneers
Cynthia Coffman (murderer) (born 1962), American murderer
Cynthia Coffman (politician) (born 1961), former Attorney General of Colorado
Denny Coffman, former Hawaii state Representative
Edward G. Coffman Jr. (born 1934), American computer scientist 
Edward M. Coffman (1929–2020), American historian and writer
Elaine Coffman (born 1942), American fiction writer
James Burton Coffman (1905–2006), American minister, teacher and writer
Jennifer B. Coffman (born 1948), United States federal judge
Mike Coffman (born 1955), Mayor of Aurora and former U.S. Representative for Colorado's 6th congressional district
Paul Coffman (born 1956), American football player for the Green Bay Packers and the Kansas City Chiefs
Vance D. Coffman (born 1944), Chief Executive Officer and Chairman of Lockheed Martin Corporation

Other uses
Coffman, Kentucky, unincorporated community, United States
Coffman, Missouri, unincorporated community, United States
Dublin Coffman High School, high school in Dublin, Ohio
USS Coffman (DE-191), Cannon-class destroyer escort